Karzan may refer to:

 Karzan, the main character in the 1938 Tamil film Vanaraja Karzan
 Karzan Kader (born 1982), Kurdish film actor, director and writer

See also 
 Kazan (disambiguation)
 Curzon (disambiguation)
 Carzan
 Karsan